Chappy may refer to:

People
 Chappy Hakim (born 1947), Air Chief Marshal of the Indonesian Air Force from 2002 to 2005
 Raymond Chappy Charles (1881–1959), American Major League Baseball player
 George Chappy Lane (died 1901), American Major League Baseball player
 Chappy (drummer) (1905–1973), Hungarian jazz drummer

Characters
 Charles "Chappy" Sinclair, a main character in the film Iron Eagle and its sequels, played by Louis Gossett Jr.
 The title character of Mahōtsukai Chappy or Chappy the Witch, a Japanese anime
 The title character of Chappy—That's All, a British 1924 film

Other uses
 Chappaquiddick Island, Massachusetts, United States, known colloquially as "Chappy"
 Chaplygin (crater), lunar crater nicknamed "Chappy"
 Yamaha Chappy, a moped or scooter
 Chappy, a UK-based online gay dating app financed by Whitney Wolfe Herd

See also
 Chappie (disambiguation)
 Albert Ferrer (born 1970), Spanish retired footballer nicknamed "Chapi"

Lists of people by nickname